Sepahbod Nader Jahanbani (16 April 1928–13 March 1979) was an Iranian general, distinguished fighter pilot of Imperial Iranian Air Force (IIAF) and the deputy chief of the IIAF under Mohammad Reza Shah Pahlavi, the last Shah of Iran. Despite being executed in 1979 by Islamic Revolutionaries, he is widely lauded as the "father of the Iranian Air Force" along with General Mohammad Khatami and General Amir Hossein Rabii , for modernizing the air force to become a potent and powerful force whose advanced equipment and training they acquired for Iran, such as the F-14 Tomcat, would save Iran's crucial infrastructure during the Iran–Iraq War. He was the Leader of the Golden Crown, the first and national aerobatics display Iranian team. He is nicknamed the "blue eyed general of Iran". By many accounts, he is considered one of the best and most capable pilots of his time.

Early life and education
Jahanbani was born on 16 April 1928 into a family with a long military history. His father, Amanullah Jahanbani, was a lieutenant general, who served in the Persian Cossack Brigade with Reza Shah Pahlavi. He was a Qajar prince, great-grandson of Fath Ali Shah. Nader's mother, Helen Kasminsky, was from the Russian aristocracy in Petrograd. He had one sister, Mehremonir and two brothers, Parviz, who was an officer in the Imperial Iranian Marines, and Khosrow, who married Shahnaz Pahlavi.

Amanullah was imprisoned when Nader Jahanbani was 12, but after Reza Shah died, he was released and made a senator by Mohammad Reza Pahlavi. By then, his father sent him to the Russian Air Force Academy, from which he graduated as a foreign cadet, and entered the IIAF in 1950 with the rank of first lieutenant.

In 1951, Jahanbani was selected to be sent to Fürstenfeldbruck Air Base in Germany to attend the jet pilot training school to become a pilot for the first Iranian jet fighter aircraft, the F-84 Thunderjet, which was scheduled for delivery in 1955, along with 15 other pilots. Upon completion of the training, 10 pilots returned to Iran while Jahanbani, along with four others, continued their training to become instructors upon return to Iran.

Career
After completing the Jet Instructor pilot course and returning to Iran, Jahanbani formed Iran's first aerobatic team, called the Golden Crown (Taje Talaii) together with other officers, including Mohammad Amir Khatami and Amir Hossein Rabii.

Jahanbani played a crucial role in the Iranian air force during the 1960s and 1970s by helping to create an effective air force. He served as the deputy commander of the Air Force. As such, he worked hard to inculcate world-class air to air combat skills among the Iranian fighter pilots. This work, led by Jahanbani, on improving the pilots' abilities, would prove crucial to the Iranian air force in the later Iran-Iraq war, when the IRIAF pilots clearly prevailed over their Iraqi counterparts. He was also general secretary of the National Sports Federation.

Personal life
Jahanbani had two children from two wives, a son, Anushiravan, and a daughter, Golnar. His son was from his first wife, Azar Etessam, and his daughter from his second wife, Farah Zangeneh. Zangeneh was the daughter of Colonel Yadolah Azam Zangeneh. Both children live in the United States. Through his son Jahanbani had a grandson also named Nader.

Death
When the Shah declared martial law in response to mounting protests in 1978, and put military officers in charge, Jahanbani was not one of the military commanders, since he had very little experience with internal security affairs. As a result, when the Shah left Iran, despite the urging of his family, his friends in the US Air Force, as well as the Shah himself and his daughter Shahnaz (who was his sister in-law), Jahanbani falsely thought that he was safe from possible purges and retaliation against the security officials who suppressed the protests, as well as his belief that Iran's powerful air force would be a testament of his loyalty to the country, not the Shah himself. In addition, he had moderate views about the revolutionaries. 

However, Khomeini subsequently ordered the Revolutionary Guards to arrest Jahanbani, among others, at the Air Force headquarters at Doshan Tappeh. He was one of the first of the Shah's generals to be arrested and was sent to a court run by the infamous Sadegh Khalkhali. Jahanbani was also tried by Ahmad Khomeini who told Jahanbani that he was a foreigner. In response Jahanbani stated that all his ancestors were Iranian.

He was charged and convicted with:
 Association with the Shah's idolatrous regime; Corruption on earth; Unspecified anti-revolutionary offense; War on God, God's Prophet, and the deputy of the Twelfth Imam

He was taken to Qasr Prison and in the early hours of 13 March 1979 where he was shot in the courtyard. 

Empress Farah Pahlavi wrote:

"A bit later, I managed to contact by phone a dear friend whose husband, Air Force Lieutenant General Nader Jahanbani, had just been executed. Insulted by one of the guardians of the revolution, he had the courage to slap him in the face before dying. She was sobbing and I, who should have been able to find words to comfort her, could do nothing but cry with her. That evening, in despair, I wrote these few lines in my notebook: "I don't feel I have the strength in me to go on fighting. I would prefer to die for my country with honor rather than be dragged toward death by the depression that is overtaking me. Dear God, if you are there, give me the strength to go on."

References

External links
 'Alí Rizā Awsatí. (2003). Iran in the Past Three Centuries (Irān dar Se Qarn-e Goz̲ashteh), Volumes 1 and 2 (Paktāb Publishing, Tehran, Iran).  (Vol. 1),  (Vol. 2).

20th-century Iranian people
1928 births
1979 deaths
Golden Crown
Imperial Iranian Army lieutenant generals
Iranian aviators
Iranian people of Russian descent
Military personnel executed during the Iranian Revolution
People executed by Iran by firing squad
Qajar princes